Banharn Silpa-archa (also spelled Banhan, Silapa-, Sinlapa-, -acha; , , ; ; 19 August 1932 – 23 April 2016) was a Thai politician. He was the Prime Minister of Thailand from 1995 to 1996. Banharn made a fortune in the construction business before he became a Member of Parliament representing his home province of Suphan Buri. He held different cabinet posts in several governments. In 1994, he became the leader of the Thai Nation Party. In 2008, the party was dissolved by the Constitutional Court and Banharn was banned from politics for five years.

Early life, education, and business career
Banharn was born on 19 August 1932 in Suphan Buri to a Teochew Chinese merchant family. His Chinese name was Tekchiang Saebe. He married Khunying Jamsai Silpa-archa and they have three children.

Banharn dropped out of secondary school during World War II. He went to work with his older brother, then founded his own building company. Years later, when he was a politician, he completed his education at the open admissions Ramkhamhaeng University, graduating with a Bachelor of Laws degree in 1986, and finally a Master of Laws.

Banharn's construction company was very successful in the 1960s, when large sums were invested in major infrastructure projects, including military facilities. His business made Banharn a billionaire.

Political career

Banharn Silpa-archa was persuaded to enter politics by Booneua Prasertsuwan, a veteran member of the House of Representatives. In 1976, Banharn Silpa-archa made his political debut when he was elected a Member of Parliament, representing Suphan Buri Province. He joined the Thai Nation Party, a conservative party dominated by the "Rajakru clan" around Pramarn Adireksarn and Chatichai Choonhavan. His party participated in a coalition government under Prime Minister Seni Pramoj and Banharn was appointed deputy minister of industry. He was elected to the Senate in 1977, but returned to represent his constituency in the House of Representatives the next year. Banharn was re-elected Member of Parliament for Suphan Buri in all following elections, receiving steadily more than 100,000 votes (60 to 90 percent of the votes cast), what made him one of the highest vote-getters in the country.

He sponsored the construction of schools, bridges, and other infrastructure in his home province, which in turn were named after him. This has led to the common saying that he "owns the province". When his party was a junior partner in the government of Prem Tinsulanonda from 1980 to 1983, Banharn was Minister of Agriculture. In 1981, he became secretary-general of the Thai Nation Party. Banharn, being one of the main financiers of the party, accumulated considerable influence inside the party, although he was not a member of the originally dominant Rajakru clan. The local press has once dubbed him "Mr. (Mobile) ATM" (automated teller machine), due to the suspicion that he had bought the loyalty of political associates in exchange for money.

In 1986 Prime Minister Prem again called him up to the government, this time naming him Minister of Transport. After his party had won the elections in 1988 and Thai Nation leader Chatichai Choonhavan had become Prime Minister, Banharn was appointed Minister of Industry. In January 1990, he switched offices with Pramarn Adireksarn and became interior minister. In December of the same year, Chatichai made him Minister of Finance. The Chatichai government was deposed by a military coup d'état in 1991. Banharn returned to the cabinet as early as April 1992, when he once again became Minister of Transport in the short-lived government of General Suchinda Kraprayoon. His party went into opposition after early elections in September 1992. Banharn took over the leadership of the Thai Nation Party from Pramarn Adireksarn in 1994 and also became official leader of the opposition.

Premiership
Under the leadership of Banharn, the Thai Nation Party won the parliamentary election in 1995, and he became the 21st Prime Minister of Thailand, leading a seven-party coalition. Banharn was involved in numerous corruption scandals, one of which diminished confidence in his administration and caused him to resign. His short-lived yet inept administration is believed to have paved the way for the economic crisis of 1997.

Later life and death

On 21 January 2008, Banharn announced that his Thai Nation Party would join a coalition with the People's Power Party, successor to the Thai Rak Thai Party of former Prime Minister Thaksin Shinawatra. Because he had earlier vowed before the Emerald Buddha never to rejoin Thaksin because of the corruption scandals, this move reinforced Banharn's image as a "slippery eel".

Upon the dissolution of his Thai Nation Party by the Constitutional Court on 2 December 2008, Banharn Silpa-archa was banned from politics for five years. Non-executive members of the Thai Nation Party immediately founded the Chartthaipattana Party (Thai National Development), chaired by Banharn's younger brother, Chumpol Silpa-archa. Chumphol was Minister of Tourism and Sports in the cabinet of Abhisit Vejjajiva. His son Varawut was deputy transport minister, and his daughter Kanchana was deputy education minister.

Banharn died of asthma on the morning of 23 April 2016 at Siriraj Hospital at the age of 83.

On 23 April 2019, a bronze statue of Banharn Silpa-archa was opening in the vicinity of the province's city shrine by the donations of Suphanburi people and the Silpa-archa family contributed to the remaining part to commemorate the things that Banharn has done for Suphanburi Province for over 40 years.

Royal decorations
Banharn has received the following royal decorations in the Honours System of Thailand:
  Knight Commander (Second Class, lower grade) of The Most Illustrious Order of Chula Chom Klao
  Knight Grand Cross (First Class) of the Most Admirable Order of the Direkgunabhorn
  Knight Grand Cordon (Special Class) of the Most Exalted Order of the White Elephant
  Knight Grand Cordon (Special Class) of The Most Noble Order of the Crown of Thailand
  Red Cross Medal of Appreciation (First Class)
  Border Service Medal

Foreign Honours
: Grand Cordon of the Order of the Rising Sun
: Honorary Knight Grand Cross	of the Most Distinguished Order of St Michael and St George (GCMG)

References

External links

 Opening Statement  – to the Fifth ASEAN Summit
 'In search of good publicity' – Bangkok Post article

Banharn Silpa-archa
1932 births
2016 deaths
Businesspeople in construction
Banharn Silpa-archa
Banharn Silpa-archa
Deaths from asthma
Banharn Silpa-archa
Banharn Silpa-archa
Banharn Silpa-archa
Banharn Silpa-archa
Banharn Silpa-archa
Banharn Silpa-archa
Banharn Silpa-archa
Banharn Silpa-archa
Banharn Silpa-archa
Banharn Silpa-archa
Banharn Silpa-archa
Banharn Silpa-archa
Banharn Silpa-archa
Banharn Silpa-archa
Banharn Silpa-archa
Banharn Silpa-archa